Cendrawasih Stadium is the main sports venue of Biak Numfor Regency, Papua. It has a seating capacity of 15,000.

References

Biak Numfor Regency
Sports venues in Indonesia
Football venues in Indonesia
Multi-purpose stadiums in Indonesia
Buildings and structures in Papua (province)